"The Groove Line" is a 1978 single by the Dayton, Ohio/European funk-disco group Heatwave. It was written by Rod Temperton. It was included on Heatwave's second album, Central Heating.

History
The song charted at number 12 in the UK Singles Chart and number 7 in the Billboard Hot 100. It also appeared on U.S. Billboard R&B at number 3. The single was certified Platinum by the RIAA in 2001.  It is ranked as the 49th biggest US hit of 1978.

The song was used in the final episode of the show Freaks and Geeks as well as in the 2013 movie Anchorman 2: The Legend Continues.

The song was also used during a club scene in the 1992 film South Central.

Sampling
The song was sampled by hip hop group Public Enemy in their song "Sophisticated Bitch" for their 1987 album Yo! Bum Rush the Show.

Chart performance

Weekly charts

Year-end charts

Sales and certifications

References

External links
The Groove Line UK 7" single release at Discogs
 

1978 singles
Heatwave (band) songs
Songs written by Rod Temperton
1978 songs
Epic Records singles
GTO Records singles